Valdejalón is a Spanish geographical indication for Vino de la Tierra wines located in the wine-producing area of Valdejalón, in the province of Zaragoza, in the autonomous region of Aragon, Spain. Vino de la Tierra is one step below the mainstream Denominación de Origen indication on the Spanish wine quality ladder.

The area covered by this geographical indication comprises about 40 municipalities in the province of Zaragoza (Aragon, Spain).

It acquired its Vino de la Tierra status in 1998.

Grape varieties
 White: Macabeo, Garnacha blanca, Chardonnay and Moscatel de Alejandría
 Red: Monastrell, Mazuela, Cabernet Sauvignon, Merlot, Tempranillo, Garnacha tinta Graciano and Syrah

References

Spanish wine
Wine regions of Spain
Aragonese cuisine
Geography of the Province of Zaragoza
Wine-related lists
Appellations